, is a Japanese photographer.

In 2005, she represented Japan at the Venice Biennale. In March 2014, she became the third Japanese photographer, following Hiroshi Hamaya and Hiroshi Sugimoto, to receive the Hasselblad Foundation International Award in Photography.

Ishiuchi's work is included in the collections of the Museum of Modern Art, New York, The J. Paul Getty Museum, Los Angeles,  the San Francisco Museum of Modern Art, San Francisco, and the Art Institute of Chicago.

Life and work
Ishiuchi was born March 27, 1947, in Nitta District, Gunma, Japan, and raised in Yokosuka, Kanagawa. She graduated from Yokosuka City Public High school and was admitted to the design department at Tama Art University, where she specialized in textile dying and weaving. She left the department in her second year.

Ishiuchi grew up in  Kiryu and Yokosuka, home to the largest naval base in the East. There, she remained until she was 19. "The scars of adolescence that I sustained there had a big effect on me, and you could say that Yokosuka was the starting point for my photography," the artist tells Ocula Magazine in 2021.

Ishiuchi began photographing with one of the most renowned generations in Japanese photography, which included such photographers as Daido Moriyama and Shomei Tomatsu. These photographers were dealing with postwar trauma while also exploring new directions in photography for the new, postwar era.

Ishiuchi has produced full collections of photography since the late 1970s. Her first photo series was a study of Yokosuka, Yokosuka Stories (1976-1977), documenting the city where she grew up. While working with them, Ishiuchi organized the all-women photography exhibition Hyakka Ryoran at the Shimizu Gallery in 1976. In 1979, she won the Kimura Ihei Award for her photoalbum APARTMENT and her photography exhibition Apaato.

Her work favors the oversize grainy prints and gritty subject matter that characterize the pictures of many photographers in the late 1960s and 1970s who preferred the are-bure, or grainy-blurry. She began to take close-ups of the bodies of the very old in the early 1990s. More recently, her photographs have addressed themes of skin, clothing, and time. In Hiroshima (2008), she photographed the clothes of victims from the atomic bombing of Hiroshima. In Frida: Love and Pain (2012), she was invited by the Frida Kahlo Museum in Mexico City to photograph Frida Kahlo's personal artifacts, including corsets, clothing, shoes, rings, combs and other accessories, makeup, and medicines. In 2022, she held her first show in Scotland at Edinburgh's Stills studio. The exhibition showed selected photographs from her previous series Mother's, Hiroshima and Frida.

Exhibitions

Solo exhibitions
 Ishiuchi Miyako: Postwar Shadows, Getty Center, Los Angeles, CA, October 2015 – February 2016. A retrospective.
 Grain and Shadow, Yokohama Museum of Art, Yokohama, Japan, December 2017 – March 2018. A retrospective.
 Ishiuchi Miyako, Stills, Edinburgh, Scotland, July 2022 – October 2022.

Group exhibitions
 1994: Japanese Art After 1945: Scream Against the Sky, Guggenheim Museum, New York
 2005: Venice Biennale
 2016-2017: Japanese Photography from Postwar to Now, San Francisco Museum of Modern Art, San Francisco

Awards
 1979: Kimura Ihei Award
 1999: Higashikawa Prize, Domestic Photographer Prize
 1999: Society of Photographer Award
 2006: The Photographic Society of Japan
 2009: Mainichi Art Award
 2013: Medal of Honor, Purple Ribbon
 2014: Hasselblad Foundation International Award in Photography

Collections
Ishiuchi's work is held in the following public collections:
 Museum of Modern Art, New York
 J. Paul Getty Museum, Los Angeles
 San Francisco Museum of Modern Art

References

1947 births
Living people
Japanese photographers
Japanese contemporary artists
Fine art photographers
Japanese women photographers
People from Gunma Prefecture
People from Yokosuka, Kanagawa
Recipients of the Medal with Purple Ribbon
21st-century Japanese people
20th-century photographers
20th-century Japanese women artists
20th-century women photographers
21st-century women photographers
Artists from Gunma Prefecture